Search2retain–Health.com.au Cycling Team was an Australian UCI Continental cycling team. After a year running a domestic team, the team applied to become a UCI Continental-level team in 2015.

Major wins
2014
Stage 4 Tour of Toowoomba, Oliver Kent Spark
Stage 4 National Capital Tour,  Alistair Donohoe
Melbourne - Warrnambool, Oliver Kent Spark

References

UCI Continental Teams (Oceania)
Cycling teams established in 2014
Cycling teams based in Australia
2014 establishments in Australia
Cycling teams disestablished in 2015
Defunct cycling teams based in Australia